Glengallan is a rural  locality in the Southern Downs Region, Queensland, Australia.

Geography 
Glengalla is part of the Darling Downs.

The New England Highway enters the locality from the north-west (Mount Marshall). The Cunningham Highway enters  the locality from the south-east and merges with the New England Highway, and then together exits the locality to the south (Willowvale and Sladevale).

History
The name Glengallan derives from the name of the pastoral run, taken up by Colin and John Campbell in 1841.

Glengallan Station School opened circa 1886 for the education for the children of the staff of Glengallan Station. In 1891 it became Glengallan Provisional School. On 1 January 1909, it became Glengallon State School. It closed in 1921. In late 1922 or early 1923, it was amalgamated with Wilsonville State School to become Mount Marshall State School.

A Methodist church was built in Glengallan in 1908.

St Andrew's Anglican Church was dedicated on 23 November 1908 by Archbishop St Clair Donaldson. It closed in 1962.

Heritage listings

Glengallan has a number of heritage-listed sites, including:
 New England Highway: Glengallan Homestead

References

Southern Downs Region
Localities in Queensland